This article covers events in 2021 in continental European music, arranged in geographical order.

Events
 1 January – The Vienna Philharmonic's annual Neujahrskonzert, conducted by Riccardo Muti, takes place without a live audience for the first time in the history of the concert, as a result of the COVID-19 pandemic.
 4 January – Dutch National Opera and Ballet announces that Stijn Schoonderwoerd will be its new general director (algemeen directeur), effective from 1 February.

Scandinavia

Top hits
Danish number-one hits of 2021
Finnish number-one singles of 2021, Finnish number-one albums of 2021
Norwegian number-one songs in 2020
Swedish number-one singles and albums in 2021

Netherlands
Dutch number-one singles of 2021

Ireland

UK

Germany
German number-one hits of 2021

Switzerland and Austria
Swiss number-one hits of 2021

France
French number-one hits of 2021

Italy
Italian number-one hits of 2021

Eastern Europe/ Balkans
List of Polish number-one singles of 2021
Czech number-one songs of the 2020s
Hungarian number-one singles of the 2020s

Musical films

Deaths
1 January 
Carlos do Carmo, 81, Portuguese fado singer
Jan Vering, 65, German gospel singer
 3 January – Tasso Adamopoulos, 76, Greek-French violist and pedagogue (from COVID-19)
4 January – Alexi Laiho, 41, Finnish death metal singer and guitarist (Children of Bodom) (death announced on this date)
10 January – Thorleif Torstensson, 71, Swedish dansband singer, guitarist and saxophonist (Thorleifs) (COVID-19)
16 January – Pave Maijanen, 70, Finnish rock keyboardist (Hurriganes, Dingo)

References

European